Friedrich Schattleitner (28 September 1923 – 4 May 2016) was an Austrian sport shooter who competed at the 1968 Summer Olympics, where he finished 35th among a field of 86 competitors in the 50 m rifle - prone position event. He was born in Kalwang.

References

1923 births
2016 deaths
Austrian male sport shooters
Olympic shooters of Austria
Shooters at the 1968 Summer Olympics
20th-century Austrian people